David Edwin Donaldson (28 February 1911 – 10 February 1974) was an English professional footballer who played as a winger.

References

1911 births
1974 deaths
People from Selby
English footballers
Association football wingers
Selby Town F.C. players
Grimsby Town F.C. players
York City F.C. players
Yeovil Town F.C. players
Boston United F.C. players
English Football League players